St. Augustine is a community in the municipality of Ashfield-Colborne-Wawanosh, Huron County, Ontario.  St. Augustine is east of Dungannon, south of St. Helens and north of Auburn.

Communities in Huron County, Ontario